PeSIT (Protocol d’Echanges pour un Systeme Interbancaire de Telecompensation) is a file transfer protocol developed in 1986 by the French Interbank Teleclearing System Economic Interest Grouping (GSIT).

It is an open protocol and multiple companies have developed implementations of it.

References

File Transfer Protocol
File transfer protocols
Telecommunication protocols